The common scale-backed antbird (Willisornis poecilinotus) is a species of passerine bird in the antbird family, Thamnophilidae. It is found in the Amazon of Bolivia, Brazil, Colombia, Ecuador, French Guiana, Guyana, Peru, Suriname, and Venezuela.
Its natural habitat is tropical moist lowland forests. As with other species of antbirds, it regularly follows swarms of army ants   as they flush insects and other arthropods out of the leaf litter.

The common scale-backed antbird was described and illustrated by the German ornithologist Jean Cabanis in 1847 and given the binomial name Hypocnemis poecilinotus. The specific epithet is from the Ancient Greek poikilonōtos "with variegated back" (from poikilos "spotted" and nōton "back"). It was subsequently included in the genus Hylophylax, but was found to not be closely related to the other species in the genus and was placed in Willisornis. It was briefly placed in Dichropogon, but this name is preoccupied by a genus of asilid flies (Dichropogon Bezzi, 1910). It was formerly considered conspecific with the Xingu scale-backed antbird.

There are five subspecies:
 Willisornis poecilinotus poecilinotus (Cabanis, 1847) – south Venezuela, the Guianas and northeast Brazil
 Willisornis poecilinotus duidae (Chapman, 1923) – east Colombia, south Venezuela and northwest Brazil
 Willisornis poecilinotus lepidonota (Sclater, PL & Salvin, 1880) – southeast Colombia, east Ecuador and northeast Peru
 Willisornis poecilinotus griseiventris (Pelzeln, 1868) – southeast Peru, north Bolivia and southwest Amazonian Brazil
 Willisornis poecilinotus gutturalis (Todd, 1927) – northeast Peru and west Amazonian Brazil

In addition to being sexually dimorphic, the plumages of the subspecies are highly variable, leading to speculations that the common scale-backed antbird as presently defined may include more than a single species. Males of all subspecies, and females of some (but not all) subspecies have white bars on the back, leading to its English name common scale-backed antbird.

References

Further reading

External links

 Scale-backed antbird photo gallery VIREO
 Photo; Article chandra.as.utexas.edu

Willisornis
Birds of the Amazon Basin
Birds of the Guianas
Birds described in 1847
Taxonomy articles created by Polbot